Windsor Locks Canal State Park Trail is a public recreation area that parallels the Connecticut River for  between Suffield and Windsor Locks, Connecticut. The modern paved surface covers the original dirt towpath of the historic Enfield Falls Canal. The park is used for fishing, hiking, and biking.

References

External links
Windsor Locks Canal State Park Trail Connecticut Department of Energy and Environmental Protection
Windsor Locks Canal State Park Trail Map Connecticut Department of Transportation

State parks of Connecticut
Parks in Hartford County, Connecticut
Suffield, Connecticut
Windsor Locks, Connecticut